Fantasi is the debut studio album by Swedish pop band Freestyle. Produced by Ulf Wahlberg, it was released by the Swedish label Sound of Scandinavia in 1983. The album was also recorded in English, as "Fantasy". In South America, the album was released as "Free Style" consisting of two songs with lyrics in Spanish. The album is one of the titles in the 2009 book Tusen svenska klassiker.

Track listing

Charts

References

External links 

 

1981 debut albums
Freestyle (Swedish band) albums